Ardozyga catadamanta is a species of moth in the family Gelechiidae. It was described by Alexey Diakonoff in 1954. It is found in New Guinea.

References

Ardozyga
Moths described in 1954
Moths of New Guinea